William H. Longshore (February 18, 1841 – December 20, 1909) was a Private in the Union Army and a Medal of Honor recipient for his actions in the American Civil War.

Medal of Honor citation
Rank and organization: Private, Company D, 30th Ohio Infantry. Place and date: At Vicksburg, Miss., May 22, 1863. Entered service at: ------. Birth: Muskingum County, Ohio. Date of issue: August 10, 1894.

Citation:

Gallantry in the charge of the "volunteer storming party."

See also

List of American Civil War Medal of Honor recipients: G–L

References

External links

1841 births
1909 deaths
United States Army Medal of Honor recipients
United States Army soldiers
People from Muskingum County, Ohio
People of Ohio in the American Civil War
American Civil War recipients of the Medal of Honor